Ashby is a train station in Atlanta, Georgia, serving the Blue and Green lines of the Metropolitan Atlanta Rapid Transit Authority (MARTA) rail system. It incorporates the use of split platforms, where the westbound platform is on the upper level and the eastbound platform is on the lower level. This is to facilitate the Green Line's split toward Bankhead, immediately west of this station.

History
Ashby was opened on December 22, 1979 along with all other stations west of Five Points, including the Five Points East/West section itself and excluding Bankhead. Ashby is part of the second oldest section of MARTA, only preceded by the stations east of Five Points.

Station layout

Renaming proposals
In 2007 Ashby was proposed to be renamed after Joseph E. Lowery, the current name of Ashby Street, while a different proposal by councilman Ivory Lee Young, Jr. suggested changing it to Historic Westside Village station, after the mixed-use development adjacent to the station.

Attractions
Atlanta University Center
Paschal's Restaurant
Bronner Bros.
Washington Park
BeltLine Westside Trail

Bus routes
The station is served by the following MARTA bus routes:
 Route 1 -  Marietta Boulevard / Joseph E. Lowery Boulevard
 Route 68 - Benjamin E. Mays Drive

See also
MARTA rail

References

External links

Station Overview
MARTA Guide
Atlanta Beltline Westside Trail
 Lowery Boulevard entrance from Google Maps Street View

Blue Line (MARTA)
Green Line (MARTA)
Metropolitan Atlanta Rapid Transit Authority stations
Railway stations in the United States opened in 1979
Railway stations in Atlanta
1979 establishments in Georgia (U.S. state)
English Avenue and Vine City